The Assizes of Capua were the first of three great legislative acts of the kingdom of Sicily of Frederick II of Sicily, Holy Roman Emperor. They were the first, promulgated at Capua in 1220, before the Assizes of Messina on 1221 and the Constitutions of Melfi of 1231.

The Assizes were promulgated on the mainland of the realm as they were a reform of the Assizes of Ariano, promulgated by Frederick's grandfather Roger II in 1140 at Ariano Irpino, nearby to Capua. The intent was, as in the previous Assizes and his coming Constitutions, the strengthening of the royal power in the kingdom, usually at the expense of the noblesse.

Medieval legal codes
13th century in the Kingdom of Sicily
1220s in law
1220s in Europe
Legal history of Italy
Frederick II, Holy Roman Emperor